Gheorghe Viscreanu (born 19 August 1961) is a Romanian former footballer who played as a right defender.

Runaways from Communist Romania
Viscreanu is the only footballer who managed to runaway twice from Romania's communist regime, at that time running away from the country being illegal. 

His first runaway was in Australia during the 1981 World Youth Championship. He played in the first two games from the group stage against Brazil and South Korea and after the end of the second one, a Romanian of Hungarian origin who was settled in Australia asked him if he wants to stay in Australia. In one night, he managed to escape from the hotel and got into a car parked in front of the hotel door. The ones who helped him escape brought him in their home and took care of him by buying him food and clothes. The next day all the Australian newspapers headlined his escape and he was invited every day at a reality show from a TV station which belonged to Rupert Murdoch. However, after ten days he was called with his lawyer at the police station, where he found out that he was deported back to Romania. In 2019, in Barcelona he met with the lawyer that represented him in 1981 and he found out that he was deported because the dictator Nicolae Ceaușescu had a secret agreement with Australia in which he allowed Romania to participate at the tournament but in case someone from the team ran away, Australia had to extradite him back to Romania. After he came back to the country, for about seven years he was constantly harassed by Securitate officers who literally followed him everywhere he would go and would sometimes enter his house when he was away. They also threatened him that if they catch him planning to runaway they would throw him in jail, he was not even allowed to leave Bacău.

His second runaway was in 1989 while he was playing for Dinamo București in a friendly tournament held in Madrid, Spain. Together with teammate Marcel Sabou, he snuck out of the hotel and went to the airport. They bought tickets to Frankfurt where Sabou said he had a friend who would help them, but when they arrived they didn't have an entrance visa so they were sent back to Madrid. When they got back at the airport from Madrid, they found out that their visa for Spain was no longer available. A police commissioner from the airport understood their situation and allowed them to stay in the airport for two days and introduced them to some people he knew from Rayo Vallecano. They signed three-year contracts with Rayo, but did not play in the first one because in those times there was a rule that every footballer who ran away from the communist bloc would be suspended for one year before being allowed to play again. Viscreanu and Sabou made an agreement that they would not sign a contract one without the other, but Sabou did not respect this pact as he signed with Real Madrid Castilla without thinking of Viscreanu's situation, a fact that ruined their friendship. When Viscreanu's one year suspension was over, Rayo Vallecano relegated from Primera División, so he played in 12 matches from the 1990–91 Segunda División season, after which he retired at age 29 because of medical problems.

References

1961 births
Living people
Romanian footballers
Association football defenders
Liga I players
Segunda División players
FCM Bacău players
FC Steaua București players
CSM Flacăra Moreni players
FC Dinamo București players 
Rayo Vallecano players 
Romanian expatriate footballers
Expatriate footballers in Spain
Romanian expatriate sportspeople in Spain
Romanian defectors
People from Bacău County